is a 1956 black-and-white Japanese film directed by Takumi Furukawa.

This film is a 1956 feature film adaptation of Shintarō Ishihara's novel Season of the Sun. It was also noteworthy because it marked the cinema debut, in a supporting role, of Yujiro Ishihara (brother of the author of the novel), who went on to become one of Japan's most successful film stars of the late 1950s and early 1960s (and who remains a cultural icon following his untimely death in 1987).

Plot
The film tells the story of a group of high school boxing team members who spend their days drinking, sailing and chasing girls, and who more often than not spend their nights getting into brawls.  In particular, it focuses upon Tatsuya, a sullen young man, who falls in love with Eiko, a proud upper-class girl.

Cast 
 Yōko Minamida as Eiko Takeda
 Hiroyuki Nagato as Tatsuya Tsugawa
 Ko Mishima
 Asao Sano
 Masumi Okada as Bandmaster
 Masao Shimizu
 Yujiro Ishihara as Mr. Izu
 Shintarō Ishihara as Soccer player

See also 
 Taiyō no Kisetsu, a 2002 film

References

External links 
 

Japanese black-and-white films
Films directed by Takumi Furukawa
Films based on Japanese novels
Nikkatsu films
Films scored by Masaru Sato
1950s Japanese films
Japanese drama films
1956 drama films